Tipella Airport, formerly , was located near Tipella, British Columbia, Canada. The only permanently inhabited communities in the vicinity are Tipella and Port Douglas.

See also
 List of airports in the Lower Mainland

References

Defunct airports in British Columbia
Lower Mainland
Lillooet Country